Murexsul valae is a species of sea snail, a marine gastropod mollusk in the family Muricidae, the murex snails or rock snails.

Description

Distribution
This marine species occurs off Transkei, South Africa.

References

 Houart, R.; Kilburn, R. N. & Marais, A. P. (2010). Muricidae. pp. 176–270, in: Marais A.P. & Seccombe A.D. (eds), Identification guide to the seashells of South Africa. Volume 1. Groenkloof: Centre for Molluscan Studies. 376 pp.

External links
 R. (1991). Description of four new species of Muricidae from southern Africa with range extensions and a review of the subgenus Poropteron Jousseaume, 1880 (Ocenebrinae). Apex. 6 (3-4): 59-76

Muricidae
Gastropods described in 1991